Chard Hayward, born Roy Hayward, (born 1949) credited also as Chard Heywood, is a Welsh-born Australian-American television actor, director and producer, he is best known for his long-running role of camp barman Dudley Butterfield in the 1970s television soap opera Number 96, he had previously appeared in a small role as a hippie in earlier episodes. Since the early 90s he has been based in the  US.

Biography

Early life
Born as Roy Hayward in Swansea, Wales, he initially pursued a career in the military, and at 19 had become a commissioned as an officer in the engineers, but decided it was not for him. After jobs as an actuary and part-time work in catering, Hayward heard about the National Institute of Dramatic Art, auditioned, and was accepted. However, he left NIDA after only 12 months to join the Pageant Theatre Company, which toured schools throughout New South Wales. He eventually worked at both directing and producing plays for the company.

Career
Hayward's role of the high-camp gay caterer and old-movie fan Dudley Butterfield in Number 96 began in late 1973 and quickly became one of the show's most popular and recognised characters. Dudley was involved in a long-running gay relationship with Don Finlayson (Joe Hasham) in the show. Dudley was later revealed as a bisexual and embarked on relationships with women, opened a hairdressing salon and then a disco, briefly became a television star, and then was shot to death in June 1977 after Hayward decided to leave the series.

His career continued steadily with roles in Australian feature films, drama series and miniseries through the 1980s. In the 1990s he acted on US television with a role in soap opera Santa Barbara. More recent appearances include Babylon 5, Lost and, in 2007, as a surprise guest for the Number 96 reunion on Australia's Where Are They Now?.

Personal life
A legacy of his army years was the nickname Chard - the surname of a famous British Army officer - which he would use as his official stage name throughout his subsequent acting career.
Chard Hayward has two sons, Adam with his first wife, former Miss Australia Sarah Gray, and Sean with one-time US actor Cynthia Killion.

Filmography (selected)

External links

 Personal_Website

1949 births
Australian male stage actors
Australian male television actors
Living people
Welsh emigrants to Australia
Welsh emigrants to the United States
20th-century Australian male actors